Auguste Jean François Arnould (29  April 1803 – 8 March 1854) was a French poet, playwright, historian, novelist and essayist of the first half of the 19th century.

He first studied law to become a lawyer but did not feel the vocation and preferred to devote himself to literature.

His plays were presented on the most famous Parisian stages of the 19th century: Théâtre du Vaudeville, Théâtre de la Porte-Saint-Martin, Théâtre de la Renaissance, Théâtre de l'Odéon, Comédie-Française etc.

Married to the actress Jeanne Sylvanie Arnould-Plessy of the Comédie française, He died in Saint Petersburg, where he had accompanied her on a tour.

Works

Theatre 
1829: La Vieille fille et la jeune veuve, comedy in 1 act and in verses, with Narcisse Fournier
1831: L'homme au masque de fer, drama in 5 acts and in prose, with Fournier
1831: La poupée ou l'Écolier en bonne fortune, comedy mingled with couplets, with Fournier
1831: Les Secrets de cour, comédie anecdotique in 1 act and in prose, with Fournier
1831: La Sœur cadette, comedy in 1 act, in verses, with Fournier
1831: Catherine II, comedy in 3 acts and in prose, with Lockroy
1832: La Rente viagère, comédie-vaudeville in 1 act, with Fournier
1832: Un mariage corse, comédie-vaudeville in 1 act, with Lockroy and Fournier
1833: C'est encore du bonheur ou Le prédestiné, comédie-vaudeville in 3 acts, with Lockroy
1834: L'Interprète, comédie-vaudeville in 1 act, with Fournier
1834: Un Mariage à rompre, comédie-vaudeville in 1 act, with Fournier
1835: Les deux reines, opéra comique in 1 act, with Frédéric Soulié
1836: Le frère de Piron, comédie vaudeville in 1 act, with Lockroy
1836: Les Jours gras sous Charles IX, historical drama in 3 acts, with Lockroy
1837: La vieillesse d'un grand roi, drama in 3 acts, with Lockroy
1837: Huit ans de plus, drama in 3 acts, with Fournier
1838: Les suites d'une faute, drama in 5 acts, in prose, with Fournier
1839: Claude Stocq, drama in 4 acts, preceded by prologue, with Fournier
1840: Un secret, drama in 3 acts, mingled with couplets, with Fournier
1841: La fête des fous, drama in 5 acts, with Fournier
1841: Le Dérivatif, comedy in 1 act, mingled with couplets
1841: La Maschera, opéra comique in 2 acts
1842: Les Fiancées d'Herbesheim, with Lockroy
1843: L'Extase, comedy in 3 acts, mingled with song, with Lockroy and Alexandre Pierre Joseph Doche
1844: Un Amant malheureux, comédie-vaudeville en 2 acts
1845: Une Bonne Réputation, comedy in 1 act, in prose
1845: Le Droit d'aînesse, comédie-vaudeville in 1 act, with Fournier
1867: Les Ruines du Château noir, drama in 9 tableaux, including a prologue, with Fournier and Henri Horace Meyer, (posthumous)

History 
1833: Struensée, ou La reine et le favori, 2 vol.
1835: Alexis Petrowitch (histoire russe de 1715 à 1718), with N. Fournier
1839-1840: Crimes célèbres, 8 vol., with Alexandre Dumas, Pier-Angelo Fiorentino, Narcisse Fournier and Félicien Mallefille
1841: Fille, femme et veuve
1841: Adèle Launay
1844: Histoire de la Bastille depuis sa fondation (1374) jusqu'à sa destruction (1789), with Auguste Maquet and Jules-Édouard Alboize de Pujol
1849: Les Jésuites depuis leur origine jusqu'à nos jours, histoire, types, mœurs, mystères
1854: Jeanne de Naples

Poetry 
1838: A la belle étoile
1840: Hégésippe Moreau. Le Myosotis
1842: La roue de fortune

Novels 
1840: La Mère-folle
1844: Les Trois aveugles, with Alexandre de Lavergne
1847: Tout chemin mène à Rome, with de Lavergne
1849: Une lettre anonyme

Bibliography 
 Ferdinand Natanael Staaff, La littérature française: depuis la formation de la langue, 1869,  
 Alfred Louis Edmond Vallettee, Mercure de France, vol.247, 1933, 
 John Armstrong Sellards, Dans le sillage du romantisme: Charles Didier (1805-1864), 1933, 
 Philippe Boitel, Les Français qui ont fait la France, 2009, 

19th-century French dramatists and playwrights
19th-century French poets
19th-century French historians
19th-century French novelists
Writers from Paris
1803 births
1854 deaths